The River Flit is a short river in Bedfordshire, England.  Its name is not ancient, but rather a back formation from Flitton which originally meant that the river was spelt with as Flitt rather than Flit.

Course
The river rises as a small pool beneath Carters Hill, a few metres to the east of the M1 motorway and just to the east of the village of Chalton, Bedfordshire.

Flowing north, it reaches Flitwick, then north east past Greenfield and Flitton, then through Clophill, Chicksands, and Shefford, where it is joined by the River Hit, then past Stanford, before meeting the River Ivel at Langford.

Completed in 1823, the canal connected Shefford with the North Sea allowing barges of coal to be brought to the town. The canal fell into decline over the following decades and in 1876 a dam was installed on the Ivel at Sandy, closing the Shefford section for good. Today, sections of the canal near Shefford are dry or have been filled in.

References

External links

Flit
Flitwick